In mathematics and more precisely in group theory, the commuting probability (also called degree of commutativity or commutativity degree) of a finite group is the probability that two randomly chosen elements commute. It can be used to measure how close to abelian a finite group is.  It can be generalized to infinite groups equipped with a suitable probability measure, and can also be generalized to other algebraic structures such as rings.

Definition 
Let  be a finite group.

where  denotes the cardinality of a finite set .

Results 
 The finite group  is abelian if and only if .
 One has

 If  is not abelian, then  (this result is sometimes called the 5/8 theorem) and this upper bound is sharp: there is an infinity of finite groups  such that , the smallest one is the dihedral group of order 8.
In fact, for every positive integer , there exists a finite group  such that .

Generalizations 

 The commuting probability can be defined for others algebraic structures such as finite rings.
 The commuting probability can be defined for infinite compact groups; the probability measure is then, after a renormalisation, the Haar measure.

References 

Finite groups